Kinghorn in Fife was a royal burgh that returned one commissioner to the Parliament of Scotland and to the Convention of Estates.

After the Acts of Union 1707, Kinghorn, Burntisland, Dysart and Kirkcaldy formed the Dysart district of burghs, returning one member between them to the House of Commons of Great Britain.

List of burgh commissioners

 1661: Robert Cunningham, bailie 
1665 convention: not represented
 1667 convention: James Wood 
 1678 (convention): John Bruce of Wester Abden, bailie 
 1681–82, 1685–1686: Robert Bruce, merchant, bailie 
 1689 (convention), 1689–1702: Patrick Wallace, bailie 
 1702–1705: James Melvill of Halhill (died c.1705) 
 1706-1707: Patrick Moncreiff

See also
 List of constituencies in the Parliament of Scotland at the time of the Union

References

Constituencies of the Parliament of Scotland (to 1707)
Politics of Fife
History of Fife
Constituencies disestablished in 1707
1707 disestablishments in Scotland
Kinghorn